Kosova Sot (English: Kosovo Today) is a newspaper published in Kosovo. The first edition was published on 12 September 1998. 

The founder of Kosova Sot is Ruzhdi Kadriu. Editor-in-chief and director until 2014 was Margarita Kadriu. 

Kosova Sot is published in hard copy as well as online.

References

Newspapers published in Kosovo
Mass media in Pristina